John Chaney may refer to:

Government
 John Chaney (judge) (born 1953), Judge in the Supreme Court of Western Australia
 John Chaney (congressman) (1790–1881), U.S. Representative from Ohio
 John C. Chaney (1853–1940), U.S. Representative from Indiana

Others
 John Chaney (basketball, born 1932) (1932–2021), American basketball player and head coach
 John Chaney (basketball, born 1920) (1920–2004), American basketball player and assistant coach
 John Griffith Chaney or Jack London (1876–1916), American novelist and journalist

See also
John Cheney (disambiguation)
John Cheyne (disambiguation)